The 2012–13 season will be Lombard-Pápa TFC's 6th competitive season, 4th consecutive season in the OTP Bank Liga and 17th year in existence as a football club.

First team squad

Transfers

Summer

In:

Out:

Winter

In:

Out:

List of Hungarian football transfers summer 2012
List of Hungarian football transfers winter 2012–13

Statistics

Appearances and goals
Last updated on 2 June 2013.

|-
|colspan="14"|Youth players:

|-
|colspan="14"|Players out to loan:

|-
|colspan="14"|Players no longer at the club:

|}

Top scorers
Includes all competitive matches. The list is sorted by shirt number when total goals are equal.

Last updated on 2 June 2013

Disciplinary record
Includes all competitive matches. Players with 1 card or more included only.

Last updated on 2 June 2013

Overall
{|class="wikitable"
|-
|Games played || 40 (30 OTP Bank Liga, 2 Hungarian Cup and 8 Hungarian League Cup)
|-
|Games won || 13 (7 OTP Bank Liga, 1 Hungarian Cup and 5 Hungarian League Cup)
|-
|Games drawn || 7 (7 OTP Bank Liga, 0 Hungarian Cup and 0 Hungarian League Cup)
|-
|Games lost || 20 (16 OTP Bank Liga, 1 Hungarian Cup and 3 Hungarian League Cup)
|-
|Goals scored || 49
|-
|Goals conceded || 60
|-
|Goal difference || -11
|-
|Yellow cards || 106
|-
|Red cards || 8
|-
|rowspan="1"|Worst discipline ||  Gábor Tóth (19 , 0 )
|-
|rowspan="1"|Best result || 9–0 (A) v Tapolcai VSE - Hungarian Cup - 25-09-2012
|-
|rowspan="1"|Worst result || 0–6 (A) v Győri ETO FC - OTP Bank Liga - 28-09-2012
|-
|rowspan="2"|Most appearances ||  Gábor Tóth (35 appearances)
|-
|  Lajos Szűcs (35 appearances)
|-
|rowspan="1"|Top scorer ||  Goran Marić (9 goal)
|-
|Points || 46/120 (38.33%)
|-

Nemzeti Bajnokság I

Matches

Classification

Results summary

Results by round

Hungarian Cup

League Cup

Group stage

Classification

Knockout phase

References

External links
 Eufo
 Official Website
 UEFA
 fixtures and results

Lombard-Pápa TFC seasons
Hungarian football clubs 2012–13 season